The Grammy Award for Best Rap Album is an award presented to recording artists for quality albums with rapping at the Grammy Awards, a ceremony that was established in 1958 and originally called the Gramophone Awards. Honors in several categories are presented at the ceremony annually by the National Academy of Recording Arts and Sciences of the United States to "honor artistic achievement, technical proficiency and overall excellence in the recording industry, without regard to album sales or chart position".

In 1995, the Academy announced the addition of the award category Best Rap Album. The first award was presented to the group Naughty by Nature at the 38th Grammy Awards the following year. According to the category description guide for the 52nd Grammy Awards, the award is presented for "albums containing at least 51% playing time of tracks with newly recorded rapped performances". Award recipients often include the producers, engineers, and/or mixers associated with the nominated work in addition to the recording artists.

As of 2020, Eminem holds the record for the most wins in this category, with six. Lauryn Hill was the first female artist to win in this category, when she won in 1997 with the Fugees. Cardi B became the first solo female rapper to win for Invasion of Privacy. Kanye West was presented the award four times, Kendrick Lamar has received the award three times, and the duo known as Outkast and Tyler, The Creator have all received the award twice. Jay-Z holds the record for the most nominations, with eleven. Drake became the first non-American winner in this category when he won in 2013. The Roots have received the most nominations without a win, with five. Eminem and West are the only artists to win the award in consecutive years, with Eminem achieving the feat twice. In 2016, Drake's If You're Reading This It's Too Late became the first mixtape to get nominated for the award, and in 2017, Chance the Rapper's Coloring Book became the first mixtape to win the award.

Recipients

 Each year is linked to the article about the Grammy Awards held that year.

Artists with multiple wins

6 wins
Eminem

4 wins
Kanye West

3 wins
Kendrick Lamar

2 wins
Outkast
Tyler, the Creator

Artists with multiple nominations

11 nominations
 Jay-Z

8 nominations
 Kanye West

7 nominations
 Eminem

6 nominations
 Drake
 Nas

5 nominations
 The Roots

4 nominations
 Common
 Lupe Fiasco
 Missy Elliott
 Kendrick Lamar

3 nominations
 Ludacris
 Nelly
 T.I.
 Tyler, The Creator

2 nominations
 Nicki Minaj
 J. Cole
 Dr. Dre
 Lil Wayne
 LL Cool J
 50 Cent
 Outkast
 ScHoolboy Q
 A Tribe Called Quest
 2Pac
 Pusha T
 DJ Khaled

See also

 Grammy Award for Best Rap Performance
 Grammy Award for Best Rap Song
 Hip hop music

References
General

  Note: User must select the "Rap" category as the genre under the search feature.
 

Specific

 
1996 establishments in the United States
Album awards
Awards established in 1996
Rap Album